A shackle is a device used as a connecting link in rigging systems.

Shackle or Shackles may also refer to:

Objects and measures 
 Certain restraint devices, such as handcuffs, legcuffs or thumbcuffs
 As part of a land vehicle, a shackle is a link connecting a leaf spring to the frame
 A nautical unit used for measuring the lengths of the cables and chains (especially anchor chains), equal to 15 fathoms, 90 feet or 27.432 meters.    
 USS Shackle (ARS-9), an American ship

Art and entertainment 
 "Shackles (Praise You)",  a song by Mary Mary
 Shackles (film), a 2005 film
Shackles or Shakles, the English translation title for the Indonesian novel Belenggu by Armijn Pane

People with the name 
 Christopher Shackle (born 1942), English philologist
 G. L. S. Shackle (1903–1992), English economist
 Maud Shackle, English tennis player
 Thomas Shackle, English cricketer
 Thomas Shackle (cricketer, born 1834), English cricketer

See also 
 Shackle code
 Shackle Island, Tennessee
 Shackled (disambiguation)
 Shackel
 Shakl
 SHACL
 SHACAL
 Shakal (disambiguation)
 Shekal